Nosratabad (also Romanized as Noşratābād; also known as Noşratābād-e Amīr Ghāyeb) is a village in Gavdul-e Sharqi Rural District, in the Central District of Malekan County, East Azerbaijan Province, Iran. At the 2006 census, its population was 173, in 35 families.

References 

Populated places in Malekan County